Susan Brady may refer to:

Susan Brady (actress) (born 1966), New Zealand actress
Susan Brady (psychologist), American psychologist and literacy expert